Kudakwashe Hilton Davies Mudariki (born 8 April 1992 in Harare Zimbabwe) is a Zimbabwe Rugby Union player for the Zimbabwe National Rugby team (The Sables) and the Zimbabwe National 7s team (The Cheetahs). He plays Scrumhalf.

Early life
Educated at The Heritage and St John’s Prep then at Michaelhouse in Natal, where he played for their First XV side in 2009 and 2010.

He represented Natal at the Under 18 Craven Week where he signed a contract with Western Province. In 2011 he represented Western Province in the Under 19 Currie Cup.

Rugby career
He represented Zimbabwe Under 20 in the Junior World Trophy in Georgia.

In 2013 made his debut for The Sables vs Namibia in Windhoek and also made his HSBC World Series debut in the Port Elizabeth 7s the same year.

He represented the University of Johannesburg in the Varsity Cup in 2015, 2016 and 2017. His performances earned him a professional contract with Jersey Reds  RFC in the English Championship.

He has captained both the National 7s and 15s teams and is the current captain of the Sables.

References

Living people
Zimbabwean rugby union players
1992 births
Zimbabwe international rugby union players
Jersey Reds players
Zimbabwe Academy rugby union players
Rugby union scrum-halves
Zimbabwe Goshawks players